Marulla of Verona or Maria of Verona (Italian: Marulla da Verona; died 1326), was Lady of Karystos in Frankish Greece in 1318–1326.

She was the daughter of Boniface of Verona, Lord of Karystos, and one of the major barons of the Duchy of Athens.

She married Alfonso Fadrique, the illegitimate son of Frederick II of Sicily. She left five sons and two daughters:

Simona, who wed George II Ghisi
Pedro, Count of Salona from 1338 to 1355
James, Count of Salona from 1355 to 1365
William, lord of Livadeia 
Boniface, lord of Aigina, Piada and Karystos
John, lord of Salamina, married Marulla Zaccaria

References

Sources

Setton, Kenneth M. Catalan Domination of Athens 1311–1380. Revised edition. Variorum: London, 1975.

1326 deaths
Family of Verona
Lords of Karystos
Women of the Duchy of Athens
14th-century women rulers